This is a list of notable events in the history of LGBT rights that took place in the year 2002.

Events
 Sweden legalizes adoption for same-sex couples, making Sweden's registered partnership nearly identical to marriage, with the exception of right to marriage in a church.
 US state of New York bans sexual orientation discrimination in the private sector.
 Tony Knowles, governor of the U.S. state of Alaska, issues an executive order banning sexual orientation discrimination in the public sector.

April
 28 – Homosexuality is decriminalized in the People's Republic of China, as the newly amended Marriage Law avoids this topic.

May
 6 – Openly gay Dutch politician Pim Fortuyn is assassinated by Volkert van der Graaf.
 10 – In Marc Hall v. Durham Catholic School Board, Canadian gay teenager Marc Hall wins an injunction permitting him to bring his boyfriend to his prom.
 17 – In Germany, the Bundestag passes a supplement to the Act of Abolition of National Socialism (NS-Aufhebungsgesetzes), vacating Nazi-era convictions of homosexuals.

July
 The United Nations Human Rights Committee in case Joslin et al. v. New Zealand concludes that ICCPR does not foresee a right to same-sex marriage.
 25 – In Satchwell v President of the Republic of South Africa, the Constitutional Court of South Africa rules that the same-sex partner of a High Court judge is entitled to the same financial benefits that the spouse of a judge would receive.

August
 Austria's Article 209 of the Penal Code was removed equalising the age of consent at 14.

September
 4 – In Hungary, the Constitutional Court repeals §199 of the penal code, equalising the age of consent for both heterosexual and homosexual activity at 14.
 10 – In Du Toit v Minister of Welfare and Population Development, the Constitutional Court of South Africa rules that same-sex couples must be allowed to adopt children jointly.
 22 – In Switzerland, voters in the canton of Zurich vote 63% to 37% to give same-sex couples the same legal rights as married opposite-sex couples. This includes tax, inheritance, and social security benefits. These rights are only given to same-sex couples who live in Zurich canton and who register with the government, promising to live together and support each other for six months.

October
 18 – In South Africa, in the case of Fourie v Minister of Home Affairs, the Transvaal Provincial Division of the High Court dismisses an application by a lesbian couple to require the government to recognise their partnership as a marriage. The decision is appealed to the Supreme Court of Appeal.

Deaths 
 October 24 – Harry Hay, 90, leader in the early gay rights movement in the United States, co-founder of the Mattachine Society and the Radical Faeries.

See also

Timeline of LGBT history – timeline of events from 12,000 BCE to present
LGBT rights by country or territory – current legal status around the world
LGBT social movements

References

LGBT rights by year